Tell Me is a South Korea quiz show program on JTBC starring Jun Hyun-moo, Park Na-rae, Kim Jung-nan, Moon Se-yoon and Lee Jin-hyuk. The show airs on every Tuesday at 22:00 (KST) starting from August 13, 2019.

Casts

Current casts 
 Jun Hyun-moo (1 - 10)
 Park Na-rae (1 - 10)
 Kim Jung-nan (1 - 10)
 Moon Se-yoon (1 - 10)
 Lee Jin-hyuk (5 - 10)

Previous casts 
 Jung Sang-hoon (1 - 4)
  (1 - 4)

Guests

Ratings 
 Ratings listed below are the individual corner ratings of Tell Me. (Note: Individual corner ratings do not include commercial time, which regular ratings include.)

References

External links 
 Official Website

South Korean variety television shows
2019 South Korean television series debuts
Korean-language television shows